Bland Independent School District is a public school district in the community of Merit, Texas (USA). In addition to Merit, the district serves Floyd and Wagner in Hunt County. A small portion of the district extends into Collin County. The district operates one high school, Bland High School.

Finances
As of the 2017–2018 school year, the appraised valuation of property in the district was $188,377,841. The maintenance tax rate was $0.104 and the bond tax rate was $0.0316 per $100 of appraised valuation.

Academic achievement
In 2018, the school district was rated "A" by the Texas Education Agency. Sixteen percent of districts in Texas in 2018 received the same rating. No state accountability ratings will be given to campuses in 2018, but all campuses and districts will receive a rating in 2019. A school district in Texas can receive one of five possible rankings from the Texas Education Agency: 
A - Exemplary
B - Recognized
c - Acceptable
D - In Need of Improvement
F - Unacceptable

Historical TEA district accountability ratings 
2018: A
2017: Met Standard
2011: Recognized
2010: Exemplary
2009: Academically Acceptable
2008: Academically Acceptable
2007: Recognized
2006: Academically Acceptable
2005: Recognized
2004: Academically Acceptable

Schools
Bland High (Grades 9-12)
Bland Middle (Grades 6-8)
Bland Elementary (Grades PK-5)

Special programs

Athletics
Bland High School participates in the boys sports of baseball, basketball, cross-country, golf, tennis and track. The school participates in the girls sports of basketball, track, cross country, golf, tennis and softball. For the 2018 through 2019 school years, Bland High School will play basketball in UIL Class 2A.

See also

List of school districts in Texas 
List of high schools in Texas

References

External links

School districts in Hunt County, Texas
School districts in Collin County, Texas